Labutta or Latputta is a town in the Ayeyarwady Region of south-west Myanmar. It is the administrative seat of Labutta Township and the Labutta District, Ayeyarwaddy Region. Labutta lies on the bank of Yway River. 

Labutta has Old Township of Labutta and New Township of Labutta called 3 mile. The township has a population of 315,218 (2017). 

In 2008 Labutta was heavily damaged by Cyclone Nargis.

Division: Ayeyeawaddy

District: Labutta (Latputta)

Weather: 80°F (27°C), Wind S at 9 mph (14 km/h), 87% Humidity

Local time: Wednesday 5:34 PM

Population: 315,218 (2017)

Township: Labutta (Latputta)

Area code: 42

Notes

External links
 "Labutta Map — Satellite Images of Labutta" Mpalandia

Populated places in Ayeyarwady Region
Township capitals of Myanmar